The 2014 Regional Women's Championship was a 50-over women's cricket competition that took place in the West Indies. It took place in August 2014, with 8 teams taking part and all matches taking place in Dominica. Jamaica won the tournament, beating Guyana in the final to win their third 50-over title in three years.

Competition format 
The eight teams were divided into two groups of four, playing every team in their group once. Matches were played using a one day format with 50 overs per side. The top two teams in each group advanced to the semi-finals, whilst the bottom two teams in each group went into 5th-place play-off semi-finals.

The group worked on a points system with positions being based on the total points. Points were awarded as follows:

Win: 4 points 
Tie: 2 points 
Loss: 0 points.
Abandoned/No Result: 2 points.
Bonus Points: 1 bonus point available per match.

Points tables

Group A

Group B

Source: CricketArchive

Knockout stage

5th-place play-offs

Semi-finals

7th-place play-off

5th-place play-off

Semi-finals

3rd-place play-off

Final

References

Women's Super50 Cup
2014 in West Indian cricket